Middlesex Township is the name of some places in the U.S. state of Pennsylvania:

Middlesex Township, Butler County, Pennsylvania
Middlesex Township, Cumberland County, Pennsylvania

Pennsylvania township disambiguation pages